The Negombo Polling Division is a Polling Division in the Gampaha Electoral District, in the Western Province, Sri Lanka.

Presidential Election Results

Summary 

The winner of Negombo has matched the final country result 5 out of 8 times. Hence, Negombo is a Weak Bellwether for Presidential Elections.

2019 Sri Lankan Presidential Election

2015 Sri Lankan Presidential Election

2010 Sri Lankan Presidential Election

2005 Sri Lankan Presidential Election

1999 Sri Lankan Presidential Election

1994 Sri Lankan Presidential Election

1988 Sri Lankan Presidential Election

1982 Sri Lankan Presidential Election

Parliamentary Election Results

Summary 

The winner of Negombo has matched the final country result 5 out of 7 times. Hence, Negombo is a Weak Bellwether for Parliamentary Elections.

2020 Sri Lankan Parliamentary Election

2015 Sri Lankan Parliamentary Election

2010 Sri Lankan Parliamentary Election

2004 Sri Lankan Parliamentary Election

2001 Sri Lankan Parliamentary Election

2000 Sri Lankan Parliamentary Election

1994 Sri Lankan Parliamentary Election

1989 Sri Lankan Parliamentary Election

Demographics

Ethnicity 

The Negombo Polling Division has a Sinhalese majority (75.5%) and a significant Moor population (13.8%) . In comparison, the Gampaha Electoral District (which contains the Negombo Polling Division) has a Sinhalese majority (90.5%)

Religion 

The Negombo Polling Division has a Roman Catholic majority (65.3%), a significant Muslim population (14.3%) and a significant Buddhist population (11.1%) . In comparison, the Gampaha Electoral District (which contains the Negombo Polling Division) has a Buddhist majority (71.3%) and a significant Roman Catholic population (19.5%)

References 

Polling Divisions of Sri Lanka
Polling Divisions of the Gampaha Electoral District